The ninth series of You Can Dance - Po prostu Tańcz! premiered on TVN on 17 February 2016. This series was changed to the new format. The judging panel was extended by winner of the first season Maciej Florek and finalist of the same season Ida Nowakowska, who joined original judges Agustin Egurrola and Michał Piróg. Kinga Rusin didn't return as judge due to her commitments as host of an upcoming series Agent - Gwiazdy, a celebrity version of The Mole on TVN. Patricia Kazadi remains the host of the series.

Judges' auditions began on 7 January 2016 in Warsaw and ended on 12 January 2016.

Auditions
Open audition began on 9 December 2015 in Wrocław and ended on 4 January 2016 in Warsaw.

In a change from previous years, open auditions are not immediately followed by filmed auditions with judges and a live audience on the following day. These instead took place on 7, 8, 11 and 12 January 2016 in Transcolor Studio in Warsaw. The 36 selected dancers will then take part in a choreography camp in Malta.

Top 36 dancers
During the auditions judges picked 36 dancers. These dancers were taking part in choreography camp in Malta.

These dancers were shown only in youcandance.tvn.pl website extras.

These dancers earned the tickets after the choreography round.

Returning dancers
This season there were some dancers returning from previous seasons.

Choreography Camp (Malta) Week 
Judges: Agustin Egurolla, Ida Nowakowska, Maciej Florek, Michał Piróg

Top 14 Contestants

Women

Men

Elimination chart

Performance shows

Week 1: Top 14 (6 April 2016)

Group Dance: Devil's Whisper — Raury / Keeping Your Head Up (Don Diablo Remix) - Birdy (Krump/Jazz; Choreographer: Ida Nowakowska & Maciej Florek) with Ida Nowakowska & Maciej Florek (Season 1 contestants and new judges)
Top 14 Couple dances:

Bottom 3 Couples solos:

Eliminated:
Łukasz Józefowicz
Paulina Wiszowata

Week 2: Top 12 (13 April 2016)

Group Dance: Light It Up (Remix) — Major Lazer feat. Nyla & Fuse ODG (Dancehall/Bollywood; Choreographer: Diana Matos)
Top 12 Couple dances:

Bottom 3 Couples solos:

Eliminated:
Nader Hasnaoui
Maja Bratus

Week 3: Top 10 (20 April 2016)

Group Dance: Turn the Music Louder (Rumble) — KDA feat. Katy B & Tinie Tempah (Hip-Hop; Choreographer: Katarzyna Kizior)
Guest Dancers:			
Michał Piróg (YCD Judge) - Satin Birds - Abel Korzeniowski
Maciej Florek (YCD Judge) - TBA
Ida Nowakowska (YCD Judge) & Igor Leonik (season 7) - I Won't Dance - Frank Sinatra
Agustin Egurolla (YCD Judge) & Paulina Kubicka (season 8) - Ran Kan Kan - Tito Puente
Top 10 Couple dances:

Bottom 3 Couples solos:

Eliminated:
Bartosz Wójcik
Hanna Szychowicz

Week 4: Top 8 (27 April 2016)

Group Dances:

Top 8 Couple dances:

Bottom 3 Couples solos:

Eliminated:
Nader Hasnaoui
Klaudia Antos

Week 5: Top 6 (4 May 2016)

Group Dance:  Bang Bang - will.i.am (Hip-Hop; Choreographer: TBA) with Natalia Madejczyk, Alisa Floryńska, Paulina Figińska, Mateusz Sobecko, Rafał Kamiński and Brian Poniatowski (dancers from previous seasons)
Guest Dancers:			
 Dancers and actors from musical Wszystko gra - Wszystko, czego dziś chcę - Eliza Rycembel, Karolina Czarnecka & Irena Melcer (Choreographer: Agustin Egurolla) 
Karolina Dziemieszkiewicz (Season 7)
Tomasz Prządka (Season 3)
Adrianna Piechota
Sebastian Fabijański (Actor)
Artur Golec (Season 8)
Igor Leonik (Season 7)
Włodzimierz Kołobycz (Season 8)
Piotr Jeznach (Season 4)
Jakub "Frycek" Frydrychewicz (Season 7)
Paulina Kubicka (Season 8)
Ilona Bekier (Season 5)
Klaudia Sadło (Season 8)
Top 6 Couple dances:

Bottom 3 Couples solos:

Eliminated:
Anna Dowganowska
Michał Kalcowski

Week 6: Top 4 (11 May 2016)

Group Dance: Everybody Wants to Rule the World - Lorde (Jazz; Choreographer: TBA)
Musical Guest: Nie mów nie - Dawid Kwiatkowski
Top 4 Couple dances:

Bottom 2 Couples solos:

Eliminated:
Joachim Uetake
Hanna Szychowicz

Week 7: Top 2 (18 May 2016)
 Guest Dancers: 
 Caro Dance
Group dances:

Top 2 Couple dances:

Bottom 2 Couples solos:

Ratings

References

2016 Polish television seasons
Season 09